La Paloma is a 1959 West German musical film directed by Paul Martin and starring Bibi Johns, Karlheinz Böhm and Harald Juhnke. It takes its title from the traditional Spanish song "La Paloma". The film wa shot at the Spandau Studios in West Berlin and on location in Lisbon. The sets were designed by the art directors Helmut Nentwig, Heinrich Weidemann and Paul Markwitz.

Cast

References

Bibliography 
 Lutz Peter Koepnick. The Cosmopolitan Screen: German Cinema and the Global Imaginary, 1945 to the Present. University of Michigan Press, 2007.

External links 
 

1959 films
West German films
German musical comedy films
1959 musical comedy films
1950s German-language films
Films directed by Paul Martin
Gloria Film films
1950s German films
Films shot at Spandau Studios